Sh! may refer to:
 Sh! is an abbreviation of Sh! Women's Erotic Emporium
 SH! is an abbreviation of Sledge Hammer!